Limburg-Weilburg is a Kreis (district) in the west of Hesse, Germany. Neighboring districts are Lahn-Dill, Hochtaunuskreis, Rheingau-Taunus, Rhein-Lahn, Westerwaldkreis.

History
1867 the Oberlahnkreis, capital Weilburg was created
1886 the district Limburg an der Lahn,  capital Limburg created.
1974 both districts were merged due to the district reorganization in Hesse.

Geography
The district is located between the two mountain areas Westerwald and Taunus. The main river is the Lahn, a tributary of the Rhine.

Coat of arms
The coat of arms consists of the main symbols of the two precursor districts. The cross from the district Limburg, symbolizing both Saint George the patron of the cathedral in Limburg, as well as the bishops of Trier who acquired the Limburg area in the 14th century. The chequered bar inside the cross derives from the Counts of Limburg of the 15th century. The lion in the inescutcheon, which was one of the symbols in the coat of arms of the Oberlahn district, is the lion of Nassau, as the area belonged to the Duchy of Nassau.

Towns and municipalities

References

External links

Official website (German)